The King's Town Bank previously known as "Tainan Small and Medium Enterprise Bank," established on November 1, 1948. In 2006, it was renamed “King's Town Bank” to symbolize a new service spirit, is a commercial bank headquartered in West Central District, Tainan, Taiwan. By 2020, the bank had 65 branches in Taiwan.

See also
List of banks in Taiwan

References

External links
 

Banks of Taiwan
Banks established in 1951
Companies based in Tainan
Taiwanese companies established in 1951